Sisterhood Is Global: The International Women's Movement Anthology is a 1984 anthology of feminist writings edited by Robin Morgan, published by Anchor Press/Doubleday. It is the follow-up to Sisterhood Is Powerful: An Anthology of Writings from the Women's Liberation Movement (1970). After Sisterhood Is Global came its follow-up, Sisterhood Is Forever: The Women's Anthology for a New Millennium (2003).

Background
Robin Morgan was awarded Ford Foundation Grants in 1982, 1983, and 1984 to help fund work on Sisterhood Is Global.

Contents
Made up of short essays by women who represent more than 80 countries, Sisterhood Is Global "was hailed as 'an historic publishing event,' 'an instant classic,' and 'the definitive text on the international women's movement,' and adopted widely as a course text in women's studies, international affairs, global economics, and several other disciplines", as Morgan has acknowledged.<ref>Robin Morgan, Foreword to The Feminist Press edition, Sisterhood Is Global. Feminist.com.</ref> 

Editions
 1984, New York: Anchor Press/Doubleday
 1985, London: Penguin Books
 1996, Feminist Press at The City University of New York, 

In popular culture
In a 2019 Paris Fashion Week show, Christian Dior's creative director Maria Grazia Chiuri debuted a collection of T-shirts that read Sisterhood Is Powerful, Sisterhood Is Global, and Sisterhood Is Forever'', respectively.

References

Further reading

External links
 Sisterhood Is Global

1984 non-fiction books
American anthologies
Books edited by Robin Morgan
English-language books
Radical feminist books
Second-wave feminism